A minstrel was a medieval European entertainer.

Minstrel(s) may also refer to:
A performer in minstrel shows, comedic skits with black face
Minstrel (1811 ship)
Galaxy Minstrels, a type of chocolate candy 
The Minstrel, a Thoroughbred racehorse

See also